The Queer Lisboa - Lisbon Gay & Lesbian Film Festival is one of the most important European forums of international LGBT film/video.

Having first been held in 1997, it celebrated its 10th annual edition in 2006, showcasing 114 films (30 feature films, 34 documentaries and 50 short films).

It is one of the most important exhibition vehicles in Portugal of alternative cinema, never ceasing to provoke numerous debates on a number of central themes in the Portuguese contemporary society. 
At one time using almost exclusively the Cinema Quarteto, since 2007 it has been featured at the renewed Cinema São Jorge. Since then it has also gone by the designation Queer Lisboa.

See also
 List of LGBT film festivals
 Porto Pride

External links
 Official Site

LGBT events in Portugal
LGBT film festivals
Film festivals in Portugal
Culture in Lisbon
Annual events in Lisbon
1997 establishments in Portugal
Festivals in Lisbon
Film festivals established in 1997
LGBT festivals in Europe